Wa-dong is neighbourhood of Danwon-gu, Ansan, Gyeonggi Province, South Korea. It is located in Gwangdeoksan Mountain, a famous tourist attraction in Ansan, a sports park and a driver's license test site, a public cemetery, exclusive soccer, badminton, and basketball courts, so sports facilities and parks are in good harmony. Hwajeongcheon Stream flows outside the east, but an undeveloped mountain blocks the center, dividing the living area. It consists of a housing type in which single-family households such as multi-family and multi-family households are more than 90%, and low-income families with 80% of tenants mainly live. It is an area in urgent need of redevelopment as nine distribution stores, the largest commercial site in the jurisdiction, are stagnating due to their small size.

History 
During the Joseon Dynasty, it was Wasan-ri and Wah-ri, Inhwa-myeon, Ansan-gun, and on March 1, 1914, it was renamed Wari, Suam-myeon, Siheung-gun.

Wadong originated from Wagol, where tiles were baked, but after being buried when the western part of Gwangdeoksan Mountain collapsed due to flood damage in the middle of the Joseon Dynasty, natural villages were all closed due to the development of new towns, and most of the villages were Gajagol, Dwitgol, Dongjak-ri, Saemal, Ansil, Wadugi, and Keungogae Pass.

References

External links
 Wa-dong 

Danwon-gu
Neighbourhoods in Ansan